Sama LelTayaran Company Limited, operating as Sama, was a Saudi low-cost airline based at King Fahad International Airport in Dammam, operating scheduled flights within Saudi Arabia and the Middle East. The airline's registered address was in Riyadh.

History

Sama was founded in March 2007 by Investment Enterprises Ltd, chaired by Bandar bin Khalid Al Faisal. Initial investment was received from 30 major Saudi private and institutional investors including Olayan Financial Co, Xenel Industries Ltd, Saudi Industrial Services Co, Sara Development Company Ltd and Modern Investment Company for Trade and Industries. The airline initially focused on domestic flights, then added international destinations during 2008. Another major restructuring occurred during 2009, when the airline's timetables were optimized towards high aircraft utilization in an attempt to improve the financial results of the company (which also saw unprofitable routes being dropped, and frequencies for successful destinations being increased).

On 24 August 2010, the airline was forced to shut down because of budgetary constraints arising out of poor funding, which had resulted in a 266 million U.S. dollar loss.

Destinations 
Sama Airlines served the following destinations (as of February 2010):

 Egypt
Alexandria - Borg El Arab Airport
Assiut - Assiut Airport
 Jordan
Amman - Queen Alia International Airport
 Lebanon
Beirut - Beirut Rafic Hariri International Airport
 Saudi Arabia
Dammam - King Fahd International Airport
Jeddah - King Abdulaziz International Airport Base
Riyadh - King Khalid International Airport Base
 Syria
Aleppo - Aleppo International Airport
Damascus - Damascus International Airport
 United Arab Emirates
Sharjah  - Sharjah International Airport

Terminated destinations
Egypt - Sharm el Sheikh
India - Mumbai
Saudi Arabia - Abha, Bisha, Gassim, Gurayat, Ha'il, Jizan, Madinah, Rafha, Tabuk, Ta'if
Syria - Latakia
United Arab Emirates - Abu Dhabi

Fleet
During its time of operation the airline operated the following aircraft:
 6 Boeing 737-300
 1 British Aerospace Jetstream 41

References

External links

Sama Airlines

2010 disestablishments in Saudi Arabia
Airlines established in 2007
Airlines disestablished in 2010
Defunct airlines of Saudi Arabia
Transport in Dammam
Companies based in Dammam
Defunct low-cost airlines
Saudi Arabian companies established in 2007
2007 establishments in Saudi Arabia